Undivide (stylized as UNDIVIDE) was a Japanese visual kei metal band. It was formed in 2012 by Leda (former guitarist from Deluhi) and disbanded on 2 March 2013.

Discography

Singles
The Catalyst (8 August 2012)

Albums and EPs
Undivide (5 September 2012) 
Materials Left Aside (5 February 2013)

References

Japanese alternative metal musical groups
Japanese metalcore musical groups
Visual kei musical groups